José López (born 1910, date of death unknown) was an Argentine cyclist. He competed in the individual and team road race events at the 1928 Summer Olympics.

References

External links
 

1910 births
Year of death missing
Argentine male cyclists
Olympic cyclists of Argentina
Cyclists at the 1928 Summer Olympics
Place of birth missing